The Former Residence of Hu Xueyan or Hu Xueyan's Former Residence is the former residence of Hu Xueyan, a notable businessman in China during the latter Qing dynasty. It is located in Shangcheng District of Hangzhou, Zhejiang.

History
The Former Residence of Hu Xueyan was commenced in 1872, during the reign of Tongzhi Emperor in the Qing dynasty (1644–1911), and was completed in 1875. The construction project of the house was launched during the heyday of the career of Hu Xueyan.

In April 2005 it was inscribed as a provincial key cultural unit by the Zhejiang Provincial Government.

On 25 May 2006, it has been designated as a "State Cultural Protection Relics Units" by the State Council of China.

It was officially opened to the public on 20 January 2001.

Gallery

References

Major National Historical and Cultural Sites in Zhejiang
Traditional folk houses in Zhejiang
Buildings and structures in Hangzhou
Tourist attractions in Hangzhou